Jyri Tapani Aalto (born 11 July 1969) is a Finnish badminton player. He competed in the singles event at the 2000 Summer Olympics.

References

1969 births
Living people
Badminton players at the 2000 Summer Olympics
Finnish male badminton players
Olympic badminton players of Finland
Sportspeople from Helsinki